The Depot at Cleburne Station is a baseball park located in Cleburne, Texas, United States that opened on May 18, 2017. Seating at the ballpark consists of over 1,750 fixed seats, bleachers, grass berm seating, and several group seating areas. The Cleburne Railroaders baseball team of the independent American Association plays its home games at the stadium. FC Cleburne, a soccer team of the Premier Development League, played their games at The Depot from May 27, 2017, until dissolving the following year.

For several years, the ballpark has hosted the year-end Southern Collegiate Athletic Conference baseball tournament.

References

Sports venues in Texas
Minor league baseball venues
Sports venues completed in 2017
Buildings and structures in Cleburne, Texas
Baseball venues in Texas
2017 establishments in Texas
Soccer venues in Texas